Carl Junction High School is a public secondary school in Carl Junction, Missouri, United States.

Campus
The school is equipped with a gymnasium, lunchroom, media center, approximately 56 classrooms, and a multipurpose facility that operates as a storm shelter. A short corridor is used to connect the high school to its neighboring junior high school.

References

External links
 

Public high schools in Missouri
Schools in Jasper County, Missouri
Educational institutions established in 1887
1887 establishments in Missouri